Iberia Flight 401 was a routine flight from Madrid International Airport in Spain to Los Rodeos Airport in Tenerife. The aircraft had first entered service with Iberia new in 1954 and was named "Santa Maria". There was heavy fog at around 21:17 (9:17 p.m.) local time. As the plane came in on final approach, fog started to settle in and blocked view of the runway, and the approach controller informed the crew that visibility was below minimal. The pilot made a very low run and initiated a go-around and made another approach to land. He got a view of the beginning of the runway, but not the rest of the runway and decided to go around at about 1,000 ft (305 m). As he applied full power, the aircraft struck a scraper, a tractor and a minivan about 50 meters (164 feet) from the runway centerline. The plane was damaged and could not gain altitude, causing it to crash in the Los Rodeos gorge besides the runway.

The post-accident investigation faulted the pilot for not diverting to Las Palmas.

External links

Images of the accident. (00:17- 01:26) . NODO (a) of 17 May, 1965. Spanish film national archives.

Aviation accidents and incidents in 1965
Aviation accidents and incidents in Spain
Accidents and incidents involving the Lockheed Constellation
Iberia (airline) accidents and incidents
1965 in Spain
Disasters in the Canary Islands
May 1965 events in Europe